Major General John Malcolm Lawrence Grover CB MC (6 February 1897 – 11 June 1979) was a British Army officer who commanded the 2nd Infantry Division in the Burma campaign, including in the Battle of Kohima, during World War II.

Early life and military career
Grover was born in British India, the son of General Sir Malcolm Henry Grover and Helen Grace Lawrence, granddaughter of Sir George St Patrick Lawrence. He was educated at Winchester College and the Royal Military College, Sandhurst, Grover was, at the age of just 17, commissioned as a second lieutenant into the King's Shropshire Light Infantry (KSLI) on 15 December 1914, four months after the outbreak of World War I. After turning 18, he was posted to the regiment's 1st Battalion in 1915, then serving on the Western Front as part of the 16th Brigade of the 6th Division, a Regular Army formation, which had sustained heavy losses. Serving with his battalion for the rest of the war, Grover was awarded the Military Cross for his service and was wounded in action three times during the conflict.

Between the wars
Remaining in the army during the interwar period, spent mostly as a captain with his battalion in India, Grover married in 1930. He became Deputy Assistant Quartermaster-General, India, and saw service on the North-west Frontier from 1930 to 1931. He attended the Staff College, Quetta from 1932 to 1933, and, after serving as a staff officer with Aldershot Command and commanding the KSLI regimental depot, he became Commanding Officer (CO) of the 1st Battalion, KSLI in 1938, which had just arrived in England from India.

Second World War
Shortly after the outbreak of the Second World War, in September 1939, Grover, still CO of the battalion, now serving as part of the 3rd Brigade of Major General The Hon. Harold Alexander's 1st Division, led it overseas to France, where it formed part of the British Expeditionary Force (BEF). There was no immediate action, however, and the battalion spent the first few months of its time in France digging defensive positions in expectation of a repeat of the trench warfare of World War I. From 18 to 28 December Grover took over as acting commander of the 3rd Brigade, and soon afterwards was posted to Major General Harold Franklyn's 5th Division as its General Staff Officer Grade I (GSO1).

The 5th Division was also serving in France as part of the BEF. By May 1940 it was decided that the 5th Division should return to the United Kingdom as a reserve formation; this was soon countermanded. On the following day, 10 May, the Germans launched their long-waited assault in the West and the 5th Division was heavily engaged throughout the Battle of France, in particular at the Battle of Arras and the Battle of the Ypres–Comines Canal, before being ordered to retreat to Dunkirk, where most of the division, by now heavily battered after sustaining severe casualties, was evacuated to England, arriving there on the night of 31 May/1 June.

Just two weeks later Grover left the division, received promotion to brigadier, and was posted to the 4th Division, then commanded by Major General Dudley Johnson (but soon replaced by Major General Ralph Eastwood), to command the 11th Brigade, taking over from Brigadier Kenneth Anderson. Like the 5th Division, the 4th had also recently returned from France, sustained heavy casualties, and needed to refit. The brigade, stationed along with the rest of the division in Southern England, was now given anti-invasion duties and training to repel an expected German invasion. Grover remained there until January 1941 and, after handing over the 11th Brigade to Brigadier Vyvyan Evelegh, he was posted to the 29th Infantry Brigade Group, succeeding Brigadier Sir Oliver Leese. The brigade was formerly an independent formation, comprising four Regular battalions and supporting troops, all of whom had returned from service in India in July 1940 after Dunkirk, and was serving as part of Major General Leese's West Sussex County Division. Grover trained the brigade throughout most of the year until, in October, he handed over to Brigadier Francis Festing, formerly CO of the 2nd Battalion, East Lancashire Regiment.

He devised and implemented a strategy to remove the Japanese from the Kohima region of India leading to the defeat of the Imperial Japanese Army at the Battle of Kohima between April and June 1944. During the battle Grover's division suffered very heavy casualties, in May losing all three infantry brigade commanders, but gaining the division's third Victoria Cross (VC) of the war, belonging to Captain John Randle of the 2nd Battalion, Royal Norfolk Regiment.

Despite being victorious in this battle, he was removed from command on 4 July 1944 by Lieutenant General Stopford, the corps commander, who was unhappy with Grover's methods. His replacement as GOC of the 2nd Division was Major General Cameron Nicholson. Grover went on to be Director of Army Welfare Services at the War Office in 1944 before retiring from the army in 1948.

Postwar
He became Colonel of the King's Shropshire Light Infantry in 1947, holding this post until 1955. In 2014, on the 70th anniversary of the Battle of Kohima, a memorial to General Grover was unveiled at Jotsama on the site of his 2nd Division Headquarters.

References

Bibliography

External links
Imperial War Museum Interview
Generals of World War II

|-

1897 births
1979 deaths
British Army personnel of World War I
British Army generals of World War II
King's Shropshire Light Infantry officers
Companions of the Order of the Bath
Recipients of the Military Cross
Graduates of the Staff College, Quetta
People educated at Winchester College
Graduates of the Royal Military College, Sandhurst
War Office personnel in World War II
People from Murree
British Army major generals
Military personnel of British India